Generalski Stol is a municipality in Karlovac County, Croatia. There are 2,642 inhabitants, 99% of whom are Croats.

Name and history 

Generalski Stol played a historically important role in defending Croatia and western Europe by preventing Ottoman incursions further west. The settlement's name (literally, "the General's Table") is a reference to the generals that planned their defense strategy here.

References

External links
 

Municipalities of Croatia
Populated places in Karlovac County